General elections were held in Costa Rica on 4 February 1962. Francisco Orlich Bolmarcich of the National Liberation Party won the presidential election, whilst his party also won the parliamentary election. Voter turnout was 80.9%.

Background 

During Mario Echandi's presidency Rafael Angel Calderón, his family and supporters in exile, were allowed to return and a general amnesty was called for everyone involved in the still recent Civil War of 1948.  Calderón was elected Congressman in the 1958 election. But meanwhile in the past election the National Liberation Party was split due to the separation of the “Rossist” faction in this election Calderon's candidacy unified PLN and other political allies into a strong anti-Calderonist ballot.

Both former presidents Otilio Ulate from National Union and Calderón himself from National Republican became candidates. PLN's candidate was, as in 1958, Francisco Orlich, one of the party's founder, commander of one of the fronts during the civil war and Figueres’ close friend.

A fourth small left-wing party named Popular Democratic Action led by socialist thinker Enrique Obregón also took part in the election nominating Obregon. Communism was illegal according to the Constitution and Marxist Parties were not allowed, but Obregon's party was officially socialist so the prohibition was not endorsed. Even so, Obregón did have the support of the traditional leadership and militancy of the (outlawed) Communist Party.

Campaign 

All parties promised land reform. Calderon's publicity was particular in saying “Yesterday social reform, today land reform” taking advantage of the socialist reforms during his presidency. As the Cuban Revolution was recent the anti-Communist speech was common. All main parties accused each other of having links with Communism; PLN because of its socialist ideology (social democracy) and Figueres alleged friendship with Fidel Castro and Calderón because of his previous alliance with the Communists in the 1940s. The far-right anti-Communist group Free Costa Rica Movement paid for a strong anti-Communist propaganda, especially against Popular Democratic Action.

Results

President

By province

Parliament

By province

Local governments

Ballot

References

1962 elections in Central America
1962 in Costa Rica
Elections in Costa Rica